State Route 329 (SR 329), also known as Deer Lodge Highway, is a  north–south state highway in Morgan County, Tennessee. It is the primary road in and out of the community of Deer Lodge.

Route description
SR 329 begins at a Y-intersection with SR 62. It winds it way north to enter the community of Deer Lodge and makes sharp turn to the east at an intersection with Irving Street and Old Deer Lodge Pike in the center of town. The highway then winds its way east then northeast through a mix of farmland and wooded areas before entering Sunbright and coming to an end at an intersection with US 27/SR 29. The entire route of SR 329 is a two-lane highway and lies on top of the Cumberland Plateau.

Major intersections

References

329
Transportation in Morgan County, Tennessee